Tern Hill, also known as Ternhill, is a village in Shropshire, England, notable as the location of the former RAF Tern Hill  station, which is now operated by the British Army as Clive Barracks. The settlement is named after the River Tern which begins just south of the settlement. The population for the village as taken in the 2011 census can be found under Moreton Say.

History 
In the 1620s and 1630s, the politician Sir Andrew Corbet owned land in Ternhill. In 1631, he leased a Ternhill property on the terms that the lessee provide a man to serve in war, reflecting the political tensions that eventually led to the English Civil War.

Transport

Road
The A41 and A53 cross over at the village and there is now a roundabout. It has direct links with major towns and cities such as Shrewsbury, Wolverhampton, Stoke-on-Trent and Chester.

Bus Service
Tern Hill is served by the 64 bus, operated by Arriva Midlands North, which runs between Shrewsbury and Market Drayton via Shawbury.

Shropshire's second commercial vineyard in modern times is nearby.

References

External links

Villages in Shropshire